The Royal Exchange Assurance, founded in 1720, was a British insurance company.  It took its name from the location of its offices at the Royal Exchange, London.

Origins
The Royal Exchange Assurance emerged from a joint stock insurance enterprise known as Onslow's insurance or Onslow's Bubble. This had been begun as the Mercer's Hall Marine Company, or Undertaking kept at the Royal Exchange for insuring ships and merchandise at sea. A similar enterprise sought incorporation in 1718, but the Attorney-General reported against this. Lord Onslow then sought a means of avoiding the difficulty by his company acquiring the charters of Society of Mines Royal and Company of Mineral and Battery Works, which declared itself open for assuring ships and merchandise in March 1719. Their opponents petitioned against this and the Attorney-General reported in May 1719 that the use made of the charters was "unwarrantable".  The directors admitted this mistake but requested their own charter in January 1720. They and another insurance enterprise each offered £300,000 towards the King's Civil List debts.  The King then encouraged the House of Commons to permit their incorporation. This was done in the Bubble Act. The new chartered company then accepted subscriptions paid on shares in the old company in payment for those on its own shares.

Chartered company
The company received its royal charter under the Royal Exchange and London Assurance Corporation Act 1719, popularly known as the Bubble Act. Under the terms of this legislation, the Royal Exchange and the London Assurance Company were the only incorporated bodies chartered to write marine insurance.  Although this eliminated competition from other corporations, private underwriters, such as those at Lloyd's of London would remain in business.  This arrangement continued until the repeal of the act, in 1824.

Amalgamation
The Royal Exchange Assurance survived as an independent company for over two centuries until merging with the Guardian Assurance Company in 1968.

Governors

Notable governors of The Royal Exchange Assurance included:

Nicholas Magens (1741-1750)
Pascoe Grenfell (1829–1838)
Thomas Tooke (1840–1852)
Octavius Wigram (1852–1878)
Vivian Smith, 1st Baron Bicester (1914–1956)
Hugh Kindersley, 2nd Baron Kindersley  (1955–1968)

See also

Barry Supple, The Royal Exchange Assurance  A History of British Insurance 1720-1970, Cambridge, 1970

References

Insurance companies of the United Kingdom
Financial services companies based in the City of London
Financial services companies established in 1720
British companies disestablished in 1968
1720 establishments in England
British companies established in 1720